Bead stringing is the putting of beads on string.

It can range from simply sliding a single bead onto any thread-like medium (string, silk thread, leather thong, thin wire, multi-stranded beading wire, or a soft, flexible wire) to complex creations that have multiple strands or interwoven levels.  The choice of stringing medium can be an important point in the overall design, since string-type mediums might be subject to unwanted stretching if the weight of the beads is considerable.  Similarly, certain bead types with sharp edges, such as hollow metal beads or some varieties of stone or glass, might abrade the string and cause the strand to eventually break.

The simplest design is a single bead centered as a focal point on the string medium. The ends of the string can be simply knotted together or components of a clasp may be attached to each end.

Next in complexity would be stringing multiple beads onto a single strand.  Here alone are numerous opportunities for adding elements to the design concept.  All the beads might be identical.  The beads might be varied (in shape, color, type or any combination thereof) and used either in a random assortment or in a deliberate repeating pattern.  Items not strictly defined as beads, such as pendants or "drops", might be placed within the strand to serve as focal points or accent elements in the design.

Knotting is a next level of proficiency in creating strands. Here the stringing medium (traditionally silk thread or another similar, synthetic medium) has knots tied into it as a means of separating the individual beads from each other. The traditional strand of pearls is a well-known example of this technique. Pearls are threaded onto silk, and a knot is tied between each one to not only space them for greater individual prominence but to also keep them from rubbing directly against each other and risking the abrasion of the nacre that gives them their luster.  This classic design can be varied by adding or using other varieties of beads or varying the number and placement of knots used.

Multiple strands can be created using either the simple stringing or the knotting technique.  Here, depending on the overall design, more planning may be called for. If the bead pattern is random, the only concern is that one strand be sized shorter than the next, so they will all lie flat and not interfere with each other when worn or displayed. However, if a specific repeating pattern is planned, then careful planning will be required so that the placement of matching portions of the pattern between the strands is aligned properly.  A beading board, generally a flat panel with measured curved indentations in several staggered lengths, is a useful tool for spacing the beads to work out the desired pattern.  Once the design has been worked out, joining the strands together might require special multiple-strand clasp fixtures unless there is a single knotting point or specific design element that will accommodate it.

There is another way of using the smallest size of beads which is naive and in Pakistan it is called Motikaari (an Urdu word for "beadwork"). It is a medium for artistic expression e.g. calligraphy or portraiture by arranging patterns of smallest size of beads of different textures and hues in the length of adjoined strings.
 
Motikaari is a craft as well as an art. The craftsperson/artist who work on motikaari is called 'Motikaar'. The method of making a pattern involves three stages.
The first stage in this art form is to prepare a desired pattern on paper. Then it is pasted on a flat panel hardboard sheet. Preparation of hardboard sheet is the second important stage of the work. In the third stage, the beads of different colors are strung together according to the sketched pattern into the thread with the help of needle in the form of independent but parallel columns of strings. (This method discovered by Motikaar Malik Nisar Ahmed of Pakistan is the simplest and easiest so far. Malik Nisar Ahmed claimed to be the creator of this form of bead stringing as he made countless items of Motikaari compared to anybody else in the world. He is the member of Pakistan National Council of the Arts (PNCA).)

Finally, after the consummation of the artistic pattern, it is removed from the hardboard so that it can be displayed in the shape of hanging strings of beads.

Among the types of wire used for bead stringing, tiger tail wire is the most common.

References 

Beadwork